Hans-Jürgen Heinsch (4 July 1940 – 13 July 2022) was a German footballer who competed in the 1964 Summer Olympics.

References

External links

1940 births
2022 deaths
Sportspeople from Lübeck
East German footballers
German footballers
Footballers from Schleswig-Holstein
Association football goalkeepers
East Germany international footballers
Olympic footballers of the United Team of Germany
Olympic bronze medalists for the United Team of Germany
Olympic medalists in football
Footballers at the 1964 Summer Olympics
Medalists at the 1964 Summer Olympics
DDR-Oberliga players
FC Hansa Rostock players
German football managers
FC Hansa Rostock managers